Yoba may refer to:

Yoba, Burkina Faso, a village in northern Burkina Faso
Yoba language, an extinct Austronesian language of Papua New Guinea
Malik Yoba, an American actor
Baked Alaska (livestreamer), an American far-right media personality sometimes referred to as YOBA